Kassebaum is a surname of German origin. It may refer to:

Kendra Kassebaum (born 1973), American actress
Nancy Kassebaum (born 1932), American politician
Richard Kassebaum (1960–2008), American documentary filmmaker
William Kassebaum (born 1962), American lawyer and politician

See also
Kirschbaum (disambiguation)

German-language surnames